São Bernardo River may refer to:

 São Bernardo River (Goiás), Brazil
 São Bernardo River (Distrito Federal), Brazil